James or Jim Lardner may refer to:

James L. Lardner (1802–1881), American naval officer
James Lardner (politician) (1879–1925), Irish nationalist politician
James Lardner (Cobra), a fictional character in the Marvel Comics universe